Invasions of the Mind is the debut studio album by American punk rock band Energy. It was released on September 30, 2008, through Bridge 9 Records.

Release and reception

Invasions of the Mind is the band Energy's first full-length studio album. It was released through Bridge 9 Records on September 30, 2008. It comes after the release of their 2006 EP Punch The Clock. The album was received with mixed reviews, being compared to early AFI, Ignite and The Misfits.

In an AllMusic review, Greg Prato gives a positive take on the album, saying "There was a time when hardcore music was played solely by (and to) a bunch of shirtless and bald tough guys. But over the years, more mainstream sounds and approaches have infiltrated the style -- to the point that "hardcore metal" groups have actually scored honest to goodness hit albums on the Billboard charts (which back in the '80s, would have seemed like a pipe dream). A good example of this aforementioned style would definitely be the Boston-based quintet, Energy, and their 2008 release, Invasions of the Mind. The speedy tempos and sometimes shouted vocals definitely point in the direction of hardcore. However, their almost Beach Boys-y harmonies, appreciation for penning a pop hook, and a sticky sweet production separate them from bands that specialize in nothing but good old-fashioned hardcore—especially as evidenced on such tracks as "Hunter Red" and "Heaven." While you wouldn't go quite as far as calling Energy "a hardcore boy band," the group's leanings toward the mainstream are undeniable throughout Invasions of the Mind".

Whereas, others would say the album fell short of the bands previously acclaimed EP Punch The Clock, calling the album mediocre with weak, overproduced, generic vocals.

Track listing

Personnel
 Jason Tankerley - vocals
 Joe Freedman - guitar
 Dan Mancini - guitar, back up vocals
 Conor O'Brien - bass
 Justin Flaherty - drums
 Mike Rendini - keyboards
 Bill Hauser - artwork
 Jay Maas - mixed
 Chris Curran - engineering, additional mixing, back up vocals
 Nick Zampiello - mastered
 Dan O' Connor - back up vocals

References

External links 

 

2008 debut albums
Energy (American band) albums
Bridge 9 Records albums